Spanish Bonk is a volcanic plug located in the Quesnel Highland of the Wells Gray-Clearwater volcanic field in southeastern British Columbia, Canada. Spanish Bonk last erupted during the Pleistocene.

See also
 List of volcanoes in Canada

External links
 National Resources Canada

Volcanic plugs of British Columbia
One-thousanders of British Columbia
Wells Gray-Clearwater
Pleistocene volcanoes